Wang Maozhai (1862–1940) was one of Wu Quanyou's of Wu-style t'ai chi ch'uan three primary disciples. When Wu Quanyou's son Wu Chien-ch'uan (Wu Jianquan) moved from Beijing to Shanghai in 1928 he remained to lead the Wu-style Beijing group. He was the founder of the Beijing Tai Miao t'ai chi ch'uan Research Centre. In 1929, the first documentary book on Wu-style t'ai chi 'The record of Wu Style Tai Chi Chuan' was published by Wu Chien-ch'uan, Wang Maozhai and Guo Fen. His primary disciple was Yang Yuting.

The beginnings of Wu-style were created by a Manchurian named Wu Quanyou (1834–1902). Wu was a student of Yang Luchan, (founder of the Yang style), and Yang Banhou. Wu Quanyou’s son, Wu Jianquan (1870–1942), loved martial arts from his youth and studied under the tutorship of his father. After 1912 he continuously developed the teaching t'ai chi ch'uan at the Beijing Sport Research Society, gradually refining his father’s style to what is currently recognised as Wu-style.

T'ai chi ch'uan lineage tree with Wu-style focus

References

 

Chinese tai chi practitioners
1862 births
1940 deaths